Guido Bernardi (21 September 1921 – 22 January 2002) was an Italian cyclist. He was born in Pontenure. He won a silver medal in team pursuit at the 1948 Summer Olympics in London, together with Arnaldo Benfenati, Anselmo Citterio and Rino Pucci.

References

External links
 
 Guido Bernardi at the Italian Olympic Committee 
 
 

1921 births
2002 deaths
Sportspeople from Piacenza
Italian male cyclists
Cyclists at the 1948 Summer Olympics
Olympic cyclists of Italy
Olympic silver medalists for Italy
Olympic medalists in cycling
Medalists at the 1948 Summer Olympics
Cyclists from Emilia-Romagna